The Battle of Marash (1920) was an important battle in the Franco-Turkish War.

Battle of Marash may also refer to:
 Siege of Germanicia or Siege of Marash (638), the siege and capture of Marash (then known as Germanicia) by the Arabs
 Siege of Marash (904), an unsuccessful siege by the Byzantines under Andronikos Doukas
 Battle of Marash (953), a battle between the Byzantines and Sayf al-Dawla

See also
  Kahramanmaraş